Uriel von Gemmingen (1468 – 9 February 1514) was appointed Archbishop of Mainz on 27 September 1508, a prince elector, and chancellor to Emperor Maximillian I on 23 April 1509.

Uriel was one of ten children of Hans von Gemmingen (1431–1487).

On 10 November 1509, he was entangled in the Pfefferkorn controversy, after Johannes Pfefferkorn seized and desired to burn Jewish books. Gemmingen and the consultant Johannes Reuchlin assigned by him did not see a danger to the Christian faith in the writings used by Jews. On 10 May 1513 he appointed the Jewish physician Beyfuss the rabbi over all Jews in the Mainzer state. The argument over the book went beyond Uriel's death in 1514, not ultimately settled until 1520.

He is supposed to have killed a cellar master in anger shortly before his own reputed death after catching the man stealing wine. Rumors suggested that he may have then faked his own death, and that the body buried in Mainz Cathedral was instead that of the cellar master, with Uriel afterwards fleeing to Italy where he died years later. However the tomb was reopened in 1724, where a corpse was found with the expected adornments of an archbishop; the matter is still considered unsettled.

Notes and references

Archbishop-Electors of Mainz
Burials at Mainz Cathedral
1468 births
1514 deaths